is a 2011 Japanese film directed by Gu Su Yeon.

Cast
 Shota Matsuda – Gu
 Kento Nagayama – Tatsu
 Kaname Endo - Park
 Motoki Ochiai - Park Little Brother 
 Yuriko Ono - Mieko
 Tokio Emoto - Masaru
 Yoko Maki – Yakuza Wife
 Sei Ashina - Natsuko
 Nobuaki Kaneko - Takashi
 Jung-myung Bae - Kang
 Yuma Ishigaki - Lee
 Gouta Watabe - Yasuda
 Naoki Kawano - Kaneko
 Kuroudo Maki - Shoji
 Dai Watanabe – Masa
 Yuya Endo - Kim
 Atsuro Watabe - Fujita
 Hakuryu - Yakuza Lieutenant
 Shido Nakamura – Takagi
 Keiko Awaji - Gu Grandmother

References

External links
  

Films based on Japanese novels
Yakuza films
Films scored by Kaoru Wada
2010s Japanese films